"The Beam" (German: Der Hahnenbalken) is a German fairy tale collected by the Brothers Grimm as tale 149. It is Aarne-Thompson type 987, False Magician Exposed by Clever Girl, with an episode like type 1290, A Fool Mistakes a Flax Field for a Lake.

Synopsis
A magician shows a rooster carrying a beam. A girl carrying a four-leafed clover realizes and declares that it is just a straw, not a beam. When she marries, the magician enchants her to think she sees a stream and then breaks it after she has hiked up her skirts to cross.

References  

Grimms' Fairy Tales
Fiction about magic
ATU 850-999
ATU 1200-1349